A Parliamentary Private Secretary (PPS) is a Member of Parliament (MP) in the United Kingdom who acts as an unpaid assistant to a minister or shadow minister. They are selected from backbench MPs as the 'eyes and ears' of the minister in the House of Commons.

PPSs are junior to Parliamentary Under-Secretaries of State, a ministerial post salaried by one or more departments.

Duties and powers of a PPS 
Although not paid other than their salary as an MP, PPSs help the government track backbench opinion in Parliament. They are subject to some restrictions, as outlined in the Ministerial Code of the British government, but are not members of the Government.

A PPS can sit on select committees but must avoid "associating themselves with recommendations critical of, or embarrassing to the Government", and must not make statements or ask questions on matters affecting the minister's department. In particular, the PPS in the Department for Communities and Local Government may not participate in planning decisions or in the consideration of planning cases.

PPSs are not members of the government, and all efforts are made to avoid these positions being referred to as such. They are instead considered more simply as normal Members. However, their close confidence with ministers does impose obligations on every PPS. The guidelines surrounding the divulging of classified information by ministers to PPSs are rigid.

Ministers choose their own PPSs, but they are expected to consult the Chief Whip and must seek the written approval for each candidate from the prime minister.

Although not on the government payroll, PPSs are expected to act as part of the payroll vote, voting in line with the government on every division.

When on official Departmental business, a PPS receives travel and subsistence allowance paid out of government funds, as with formal members of the government. This makes the PPS the only type of unpaid advisor who receives reimbursement in the course of duty.

Overseas travel for PPSs must be approved by the Prime Minister and is granted only in exceptional cases.

The role in the career of MPs 
The role of PPS is seen as a starting point for many MPs who aspire to become ministers themselves. According to Philip W. Buck, a professor of political science at Stanford University:

After the leaking of party details in emails associated with Desmond Swayne, PPS to David Cameron, a writer of the Thirsk and Malton Labour Party Constituency Blog commented:

Current Parliamentary Private Secretaries 
The following is a list of Parliamentary Private Secretaries in the UK, since the swearing in of the Truss ministry on 6 September 2022. The Leader of the Opposition usually has at least one Parliamentary Private Secretary as well.

Johnson ministry (2022) 
The following is a list of Parliamentary Private Secretaries under the Second Johnson ministry as of April 2022.

Johnson ministry (2021)

Notable Parliamentary Private Secretaries to the Prime Minister

While giving the holder a close-up view of the workings of government at the highest levels, relatively few Parliamentary Private Secretaries to the Prime Minister seem to have gone on to serve at the highest level of government themselves, although Sir Alec Douglas-Home served as Prime Minister in 1963–4, while Anthony Barber was Chancellor of the Exchequer from 1970 to 1974,  Robert Carr, Home Secretary, 1972–4, and Christopher Soames, Peter Shore, and Gavin Williamson, the future Secretary of State for Education, all went on to be senior Cabinet ministers.

J. C. C. Davidson: to Bonar Law
Alec Douglas-Home, Lord Dunglass: to Neville Chamberlain, 1937–1940
Brendan Bracken: to Winston Churchill, 1940–1941
Christopher Soames: to Winston Churchill, 1952–1955
Robert Carr: to Sir Anthony Eden, 1955
Anthony Barber: to Harold Macmillan, 1957–1959
Peter Shore: to Harold Wilson, 1965–1966
Timothy Kitson: to Edward Heath, 1970–1974
Ian Gow: to Margaret Thatcher, 1979–1983
Peter Morrison: to Margaret Thatcher, 1990
Graham Bright: to John Major, 1990–1994
Gavin Williamson: to David Cameron, 2013–2016
George Hollingbery: to Theresa May, 2016–2017

See also
 Parliamentary secretary
 Permanent secretary
 Private secretary
Principal Private Secretary

References

External links 
 BBC: A-Z of Politics
 TheyWorkForYou: List of MPs and the posts that they hold
 Ministerial code related to PPSs
Parliamentary private secretaries, Institute for Government explainer

Ministerial positions in the Government of the United Kingdom